Cosmopterix victor is a moth in the family Cosmopterigidae. It is found in Japan.

References

Natural History Museum Lepidoptera generic names catalog

victor